The Men's Allam British Open 2015 is the men's edition of the 2015 British Open Squash Championships, which is a PSA World Series event (Prize money : 150,000 $). The event took place at the Sports Arena in Hull in England from 11 May to 17 May. Mohamed El Shorbagy won his first British Open trophy, beating Grégory Gaultier in the final.

Prize money and ranking points
For 2015, the prize purse was $150,000. The prize money and points breakdown is as follows:

Seeds

Draw and results

See also
2015 Men's World Open Squash Championship
2015 Women's British Open Squash Championship

References

External links
PSA British Open 2015 page
British Open 2015 official website

Men's British Open Squash Championships
Men's British Open
Men's British Open
Men's British Open Squash Championship
Squash in England
Men's sport in the United Kingdom
Sport in Kingston upon Hull
2010s in Kingston upon Hull